Gian Filippo Felicioli (born 30 September 1997) is an Italian professional footballer who plays as a left back for  club Cittadella.

Club career 
Felicioli is an AC Milan's youth sector graduate. He received his first ever call-up to the senior team from the head coach Filippo Inzaghi ahead of a home Serie A game against Parma played on 1 February 2015; despite the call, he remained an unused substitute. He made his Serie A debut on 3 May 2015 against S.S.C. Napoli, replacing Giacomo Bonaventura after 84 minutes in a 3–0 away defeat.

On 13 July 2016 he was loaned out to Serie B club Ascoli for one season.

On 13 June 2017 he signed a new contract with AC Milan until 2021 and was immediately loaned out to Hellas Verona for the 2 consecutive seasons. The buyout option was also included in his loan deal.

After only one year at Hellas Verona on loan, Felicioli joined to Serie B side Perugia until 30 June 2019 on loan from Milan.

On 18 July 2019, Felicioli signed to Serie B club Venezia.

On 31 August 2021, he returned to Ascoli on loan. 

On 11 July 2022, Felicioli was released from his contract with Venezia by mutual consent.

On 23 July 2022, he signed with Cittadella.

Personal life
On 16 June 2020, Venezia declared that Felicioli had tested positive for COVID-19 during its pandemic in Italy.

Career statistics

Club 
Updated 12 April 2021

References 

Living people
1997 births
Italian footballers
Italy youth international footballers
Italy under-21 international footballers
S.S. Maceratese 1922 players
Ascoli Calcio 1898 F.C. players
A.C. Milan players
Hellas Verona F.C. players
Venezia F.C. players
A.S. Cittadella players
Serie A players
Serie B players
Association football midfielders